Condoto is the third most important municipality in the Chocó Department, after Quibdó and Istmina. It is situated in the south of the department and its main economical activity is mining (it is rich in gold and platinum) and agriculture. Condoto is also known as the "Platinum Capital of Colombia".

Climate
Condoto has an extremely wet tropical rainforest climate (Af).

References

Municipalities of Chocó Department